Seraj Munir (1901–1957) was an Egyptian film actor. He appeared in 46 films between 1930 and 1957.

Selected filmography
 The Leech (1956)
 Al-Malak al-Zalem (1954)
 Lahn al-Kholood (1952)
 Amina (1951)
 Kursi al-I`tiraf (1949)
 The Adventures of Antar and Abla (1948)
 Abu Zayd al-Hilali (1947)
 Rossassa Fel Qalb (1944)
 Red Orchids (1938)
 Napoleon Is to Blame for Everything (1938)

External links

1901 births
1957 deaths
Egyptian male film actors
Male actors from Cairo
20th-century Egyptian male actors